Kamal Pur Majra Burari is a census town in North district in the Indian territory of Delhi.

References

Cities and towns in North Delhi district